Abdul Rehman Goth is a now a neighbourhood of Keamari Town in Karachi, Sindh, Pakistan. It is located on Hawke's Bay, near French Beach.

Abdul Rehman Goth is a centuries-old fishing village, locally known as "Bhuleji". A little way back from the shore, small homes made of concrete brick line the narrow streets. The main economic activity is fishing. Fishermen belong to Mirwani, Muhammad Hasni, Siapad Sajdi, Sasoli and Sanghur Baloch tribes.

References 

 
Neighbourhoods of Karachi